Fritz Larsson (22 October 1882 – 17 October 1958) was a Swedish wrestler. He competed in the men's Greco-Roman light heavyweight at the 1908 Summer Olympics.

References

External links
 

1882 births
1958 deaths
Swedish male sport wrestlers
Olympic wrestlers of Sweden
Wrestlers at the 1908 Summer Olympics
Sportspeople from Gothenburg